Major-General Edward Braddock (January 1695 – 13 July 1755) was a British officer and commander-in-chief for the Thirteen Colonies during the start of the French and Indian War (1754–1763), the North American front of what is known in Europe and Canada as the Seven Years' War (1756–1763). He is generally best remembered for his command of a disastrous expedition against the French-occupied Ohio River Valley in 1755; he was killed in the effort.

Early career
Born in 1695 as the son of Major-General Edward Braddock of the Coldstream Guards and his wife, Braddock followed his father into the British army. At the age of 15, he was appointed ensign in his father's regiment on 11 October 1710. He was promoted to lieutenant of the grenadier company in 1716. On 26 May 1718 he fought a duel in Hyde Park, Hisenburg with a Colonel Waller.

Braddock was promoted to captain in 1736, at the age of 41. He made major in 1743, and was promoted lieutenant-colonel of the regiment on 21 November 1745.

He participated in the Siege of Bergen op Zoom in 1747. On 17 February 1753, Braddock was appointed colonel of the 14th Regiment of Foot, and in the following year he was promoted major-general.

North America

Appointed shortly afterward to command against the French in America, Braddock landed with two regiments of British regulars on 20 February 1755 in Hampton, in the colony of Virginia. He met with several of the colonial governors at the Congress of Alexandria on 14 April and was persuaded to undertake vigorous actions against the French. The attack would proceed on four fronts: a general from Massachusetts would attack at Fort Niagara, General William Johnson would attack Fort Saint-Frédéric at Crown Point, Colonel Robert Monckton at Fort Beausejour on the Bay of Fundy, while Braddock himself would lead an expedition against Fort Duquesne (now Pittsburgh) at the Forks of the Ohio River.

After some months of preparation, in which he was hampered by administrative confusion and want of resources previously promised by the colonials, the Braddock expedition took the field with a picked column, in which George Washington served as a volunteer officer. Braddock took some of his men and marched forward, leaving most of his men behind. The column crossed the Monongahela River on 9 July 1755, and shortly afterward collided head-on with an Indian and French force which was rushing from Fort Duquesne to oppose the river crossing. Although the initial exchange of musketry favored the British, felling the French commander and causing some Canadian militia to flee, the remaining Indian/French force reacted quickly. They ran down the flanks of the column and put it under a murderous crossfire.

Braddock's troops reacted poorly and became disordered. The British attempted retreat, but ran into the rest of the British soldiers earlier left behind. Braddock rallied his men repeatedly, but fell at last, mortally wounded by a shot through the chest. Although the exact causes of the defeat are debated to this day, a contributing factor was likely Braddock's underestimation of how effectively the French and Indians could react in a battle situation, and how rapidly the discipline and fighting effectiveness of his own men could evaporate.

An article published in The Roanoke Times on 15 April 1951, claims that Braddock was shot dead by an American soldier called Benjamin Bolling. According to the article, Bolling intentionally shot Braddock to protect the lives of his fellow American soldiers during the ambush, as British troops were firing at American troops under the mistaken impression that they were actually French troops due to the fact that many Americans had taken cover in the tree line. The death of Braddock then allowed for Washington to take command and order a retreat, which, according to the article, allowed for the Americans to fall back without being further fired upon by the confused British, saving many of their lives.

Braddock was borne off the field by Washington and Col. Nicholas Meriwether,; he died on 13 July from wounds suffered in the battle. Before he died, Braddock left Washington his ceremonial sash that he wore with his battle uniform, as well as his two pistols. Some of his last words were, "Who would have thought?" and "we shall know better another time". Reportedly, Washington always took this sash with him for the rest of his life, both as the commander of the Continental Army and for his presidential duties. It is still on display today at Washington's home on the Potomac River, Mount Vernon.

Braddock was buried just west of Great Meadows, where the remnants of the column halted on its retreat to reorganize. He was buried in the middle of the road that his men had just cut through and wagons were rolled over top of the grave site to prevent his body from being discovered and desecrated by the Indians. George Washington presided at the burial service, as the chaplain had been severely wounded.

Legacy
 

Benjamin Franklin's Autobiography (1791) includes an account of helping General Braddock garner supplies and carriages for the general's troops.  He also describes a conversation with Braddock in which he explicitly warned the General that his plan to march troops to the fort through a narrow valley would be dangerous because of the possibility of an ambush.  This is sometimes cited as advice against the disastrous eventual outcome, but the fact remains that Braddock was not ambushed in that final action, and the battle site was not, in any case, a narrow valley. Braddock had in fact taken great precautions against ambuscade, and had crossed the Monongahela an additional time to avoid the narrow Turtle Creek defile.

In 1804, human remains believed to be Braddock's were found buried in the roadway about 1.5 miles (2.4 km) west of Great Meadows by a crew of road workers.  The remains were exhumed. A marble monument was erected over the new grave site in 1913 by the Coldstream Guards.

General Braddock is the namesake of Braddock Borough, Mt. Braddock, Braddock Hills, and North Braddock in Pennsylvania; the community of Braddock Heights or Braddock Mountain west of Frederick, Maryland; Braddock Middle School and Braddock Road in Cumberland, Maryland; and, in Virginia, Braddock Road, which runs from Alexandria to Aldie, a separate Braddock Road within the city of Alexandria – namesake of the Metrorail station at its eastern terminus – and Braddock Street in Winchester. Plus sections of the road cut by the British Army is known as "Braddock's Road" and forms most of eastern U.S. Route 40 in Maryland and Pennsylvania.

In fiction
Braddock appears in the video game Assassin's Creed III, where George Washington is introduced as a young officer serving under Braddock in the French and Indian war. The game portrays Braddock as a ruthless general, who indiscriminately kills his enemies, civilians, and even his own allies to achieve his goals. Additionally, he is a former member of the fictitious Templar Order, and a rival of Haytham Kenway, the playable character during the game's early missions. During his 1755 expedition, he is assassinated by Haytham with the help of several Native American tribes, who sought to see Braddock eliminated because his men ravaged their villages. 
 Robert Matzen directed, wrote and produced the documentary When the Forest Ran Red: Washington, Braddock & a Doomed Army, which dramatizes the ambush of Braddock by 250 French soldiers and 600 Native Americans.

See also
 Great Britain in the Seven Years War

References

Footnotes

Sources
 explorepahistory.com
 Fred Anderson, Crucible of War: The Seven Years' War and the Fate of Empire in British North America: 1754-1766 (New York: Alfred A. Knopf, 2000).
 Paul Kopperman, Braddock at the Monongahela (Pittsburgh, PA: University of Pittsburgh Press, 1977).
 Lee McCardell, Ill-Starred General: Braddock of the Coldstream Guards (Pittsburgh, PA: University of Pittsburgh Press, 1958).
 Louis M. Waddell and Bruce D. Bomberger, The French and Indian War in Pennsylvania:Fortification and Struggle During the War for Empire (Harrisburg, PA: Pennsylvania Historical and Museum Commission, 1996).
Thomas E. Crocker, Braddock's March: How the Man Sent To Seize a Continent Changed American History (Yardley, PA: Westholme, 2009).

Further reading

W. Sargent, The history of an expedition against Fort Duquesne in 1755: under Major-General Edward Braddock (1855)
J. K. Lacock, 'Braddock Road', Pennsylvania Magazine of History and Biography, 38 (1914), 1–37
S. Pargellis, 'Braddock's defeat', American Historical Review, 41 (1935–6), 253–69
Thomas E. Crocker, Braddock's March: How the Man Sent To Seize a Continent Changed American History (Yardley, PA: Westholme, 2009)
G. A. Bellamy, An apology for the life of George Anne Bellamy, ed. [A. Bicknell], 4th edn, 5 vols. (1786)
Report on the manuscripts of Mrs Frankland-Russell-Astley of Chequers Court, Bucks., HMC, 52 (1900)
S. Pargellis, ed., Military affairs in North America, 1748–1765: selected documents from the Cumberland papers in Windsor Castle (1936)
Walpole, Corr., vol. 20 · parish register, St Margaret's, City Westm. AC
 Wise County Has Own Story of Braddock Death, Roanoke Times, Roanoke Virginia 15 April 1951.

External links

The Battle of the Monongahela

 
 

1755 deaths
British Army major generals
British Army personnel of the War of the Austrian Succession
British Army personnel of the French and Indian War
Military personnel killed in the French and Indian War
Coldstream Guards officers
West Yorkshire Regiment officers
1695 births
People from Perth and Kinross
British duellists